Ainsliaea apiculata, commonly known as small maple-leaf ainsliaea, is a perennial species of flowering plant in the family Asteraceae. It is commonly found in the Beech Forests of Eastern Asia. In Taiwan and Japan, it is found near low hills or mountain slopes.

References

Pertyoideae
Flora of Eastern Asia
Plants described in 1854